The Stillwater Dam is an embankment dam on the Lackawanna River in Susquehanna County, Pennsylvania. The primary purpose of the dam is flood control and its reservoir is usually maintained at low levels for that purpose. The high-water mark for the reservoir was on 2 April 1993 when it reached  and a capacity of 88.9%.

References

Buildings and structures in Susquehanna County, Pennsylvania
Dams in Pennsylvania
Dams completed in 1960